Scarlet Heart 2 (Chinese: 步步惊情) is a 2014 Chinese television series. It is the sequel to Scarlet Heart (2011), and continues the story after the time traveling protagonist, Zhang Xiao (Cecilia Liu), returns to her own time following the death of Ma'ertai Ruoxi. The story is not considered to be canon to Tong Hua's novel Bu Bu Jing Xin because the author never wrote a sequel, although some of the cast members from the first series have returned. Unlike its predecessor, the series does not involve time traveling and will be set in the present, resolving the loose ends left by the cliffhanger.

It began filming in Tianjin, China in March 2013 and ended in Hong Kong in June 2013. The series aired on Zhejiang TV from 22 April to 7 May 2014. Due to the restrictions on time-traveling dramas in Mainland China, the 39 original episodes were cut down to 35 and re-assembled to 41.

Synopsis
It has been three months since Zhang Xiao woke up from a coma and she can't forget about the Fourth Prince. One day, at the museum, she meets a man identical to him; He is Yin Zheng, the stepson of Zhentian Corporation's chairman. To find out his connection with the Fourth Prince, Zhang Xiao becomes a designer at Zhentian. Shortly after, however, an accident occurs and she loses her memories as Ruoxi. She starts to date a kind man named Kang Sihan, Yin Zheng's stepbrother; meanwhile, the latter dates Lan Lan, a model identical to Zhang Xiao who hides a mysterious past. Helped by his uncle, Yin Zheng wants to avenge the death of his biological father by ruining Kang Zhentian. Due to her connection with Sihan, Zhang Xiao finds herself unwittingly caught in the center of a power struggle.

Cast
 Cecilia Liu as Zhang Xiao / Lan Lan
 Chai Wei as Zhang Xiao / Lan Lan (child)
 Nicky Wu as Yin Zheng
 Zheng Wei as Yin Zheng (child)
 Sun Yizhou as Kang Sihan
 Bian Chen as Kang Sihan (child)
 Jiang Jinfu as Kang Siyu
 Damian Lau as Kang Zhentian
 Huang You Ming as Kang Zhentian (young)
 Chen Xiang as Huang Di, Zhang Xiao's ex-boyfriend
 Ye Zuxin as Jack
 Yico Zeng as Ling Dang, Siyu's best friend
 Cai Yatong as Mo Xiaohe, Zhang Xiao's colleague
 Gan Yu as Zhang Zejiang, Zhang Xiao's father
 Ye Qing as Meng Xinyi, Zhang Xiao's best friend and Sihan's girlfriend
 Zhang Jiang as Zhou Yue, Sihan's best friend
 Annie Liu as Ma Yinuo
 Yin Zhuzheng as Yin Chenggui, Yin Zheng's uncle
 Zhao Chulun as Han Qing, Yin Chenggui's right hand
 He Yin as Zhao Lan, Yin Zheng's mother
 Wu Li as Qiao Qi, Yin Zheng's secretary
 Wang Zhifei as Yin Chengyi, Yin Zheng's father
 Deng Limin as Liu Donghai, director at Zhentian group
 Da Li as Wang Tiecheng, director at Zhentian group
 – as Xiao Hua, Zhang Xiao's biological father
 Cecilia Liu as Qin Yuzhen, Zhang Xiao's mother
 Gu Yan as Meng Yinan, Xinyi's mother

Soundtrack

Ratings 

 Highest ratings are marked in red, lowest ratings are marked in blue

Awards and nominations

References

External links
Scarlet Heart 2 at Tangren Media 
 

Scarlet Heart
Chinese romance television series
Television series by Tangren Media
Sequel television series
Fashion-themed television series
2014 Chinese television series debuts
2014 Chinese television series endings
Zhejiang Television original programming
Fiction about amnesia